San Ramón District is one of six districts of the province Chanchamayo in Peru.

References